Saint Pedro Poveda College (more commonly known as Poveda, formerly known as the Poveda Learning Centre and Institución Teresiana) is a private, Roman Catholic co-educational school run by the Teresian Association of Lay Missionaries, which was founded in Spain.

It is located in the heart of Metro Manila's Ortigas Business District. The alumnae and present students of this school include daughters and granddaughters of Filipino presidents, industrialists, politicians, businessmen and prominent figures in Philippine society.

Founded in 1960 as Institución Teresiana, the school was inaugurated by Maria del Carmen Franco de Martinez-Bordiu, the Marquesa de Villaverde and only daughter of Generalissimo Francisco Franco of Spain. It conducts classes in three languages: English, Spanish and Filipino.

The school's regular program from Grade 1 to Grade 12 is exclusively for girls, while its preschool program from Pre-Kindergarten to Kinder 2 and the Poveda Distance Learning Program (PDLP) with offerings from Grade 7 to Grade 10 are open to both male and female students.

History and Academics

Formerly Poveda Learning Centre, the heritage of Saint Pedro Poveda stems back to 1960 when Institución Teresiana was opened. The school first offered kindergarten and primary classes, and began offering preschool, elementary and high school education by 1969.

Pedro Poveda's philosophy and principles of education are integrated in the school's Personalized Education Program (PEP).

On December 3, 1974, during the birth centennial celebration of Saint Pedro Poveda, Institución Teresiana changed its name to Poveda Learning Centre as a fitting tribute to him. That same year, UNESCO honored Pedro Poveda as "Humanist and Educator".

Two degree programs in the field of education and business administration were offered, effective 2005–2006. With the expansion into tertiary education, the name of the school was changed to Saint Pedro Poveda College.

Campus

Segovia Building
Preschool students (pre-K, Kinder 1–2) and Grades 1–6 occupy this building. It is named after Josefa Segovia. It houses the LEAP Center, Guidance Center, playground, and rooms for extracurricular music classes.

Victoria Building
Grade 7 students occupy this building. It is named after Blessed Victoria Diez. It also houses the Administrative Support Services Office, Archives and Records Management Office, IMC (Library) and the Audio-Visual Room.

Poveda Main Building
This is the oldest building on the campus. Junior High school students from Grades 8–10 occupy this building. It houses the Office of the President, the MIS, Student Affairs and Activities Office (for the Student Council of Poveda -SCOP), Chapel - Covadonga and the Little Theater.

Canteen Building
This is a fully air-conditioned two-storey building. Both floors are used as dining areas, and the second floor is connected to the gymnasium/auditorium.

Gymnasium/Auditorium Building
There are three levels: the ground level houses the Registrar and Admissions Office, HRMDO, Finance and the main lobby; the second is the Alameda Hall with a Muti-Purpose Room and Studio; the third has full auditorium seating with a basketball court that converts to a stage.

Poveda Annex Building
This is the newest building. The students that occupy this building are Senior High School (Grades 11 and 12). They also have an Art Room, Robotics Lab, Physics Lab, Conference Rooms, Resource - Incubation Center and Vice Principals Office.

Notable Alumnae

Government
 Joy Belmonte – mayor of Quezon City; daughter of journalist Betty Go-Belmonte and former House speaker and Quezon City mayor Feliciano Belmonte Jr.
 Marides Fernando – former mayor of Marikina; wife of former Metropolitan Manila Development Authority Chairman  Bayani Fernando
 Imee Marcos – senator; daughter of former President Ferdinand Marcos and former First Lady Imelda Marcos.

Fashion
 Amina Aranaz – fashion designer; creative director of Aranaz; executive director of SOFA Design Institute
 Mich Dulce – fashion designer; International Young Creative Entrepreneur awardee

News/Media
 Lia Cruz – TV show host; UAAP courtside reporter
 Natashya Gutierrez – Journalist; Multimedia reporter and anchor for Rappler
 Bettina Magsaysay – Reporter and anchor for ABS CBN

Entertainment
 Ciara Sotto – actress; daughter of actress Helen Gamboa and Senator Vicente Sotto III
 Karylle Tatlonghari – singer, actress, and TV host; daughter of singer Zsa-Zsa Padilla
 KC Concepcion – actress/TV host; daughter of actress Sharon Cuneta and actor Gabby Concepcion
 Kris Aquino – television personality and actress; daughter of former Senator Benigno S. Aquino Jr. and former President Corazon Cojuangco-Aquino; sister of former President Benigno S. Aquino III
Liza Gino – multi-award-winning author of Imelda's Secret  Gino was awarded the Print Journalism Award-Best Book (Fiction) – Imelda’s Secret (USA) is a historical fiction novel about the experiences of young girls and women who were abducted and forced into sexual slavery during World War II. They were known as “Comfort Women.”  Gino is also a Bb Pilipinas winner List of Binibining Pilipinas titleholders
 Mylene Dizon – FAMAS Award-nominated actress; Gawad Urian Award winner
 Ria Atayde – actress; daughter of actress Sylvia Sanchez and sister of actor Arjo Atayde
 Zia Quizon – singer; daughter of singer Zsa-Zsa Padilla and actor Dolphy

Sports
 Noelle Wenceslao – first Filipino woman and one of the first three Southeast Asian women to scale Mount Everest in 2007
 Bea de Leon – volleyball player, 2-time UAAP Champion, UAAP 81 Captain & Finals MVP, represented the country during 2015 U23 & SEA Games

References

External links
St. Pedro Poveda College official website

Catholic universities and colleges in Metro Manila
Catholic elementary schools in Metro Manila
Catholic secondary schools in Metro Manila
Girls' schools in the Philippines
Women's universities and colleges in the Philippines
Educational institutions established in 1960
1960 establishments in the Philippines
Universities and colleges in Quezon City
Ortigas Center